Preethse is a 2000 Indian Kannada-language psychological thriller film starring  Shiva Rajkumar, Upendra and Sonali Bendre. The film was  directed by D Rajendra Babu and produced by Rockline Venkatesh. The film major part was shot in Australia as well. The film is a remake of the 1993 Bollywood film Darr. The film was dubbed in Telugu as Sadist.
Preethse was the second highest grossing Kannada film of the year 2000 behind Vishnuvardhan's Yajamana. It ran for 25 weeks and became Upendra's third consecutive blockbuster after A and Upendra.

Plot 
The film begins with Kiran (Sonali Bendre), a college student, returning home to her brother (Ananth Nag) and his wife (Vanitha Vasu) for Holi celebrations and being obsessively stalked along the way by Chandra (Upendra), her classmate who has a crush on her. Kiran's boyfriend Surya (Shivrajkumar) is a Commander (Special Forces) and is on a mission to free a child hostage from some terrorists on the high seas. Surya saves the child hostage. Surya's Captain is also the father of Chandra, Admiral Ashok Rao. Chandra tries to be friendly with Surya in order to be closer to Kiran.

When Kiran reaches home, she is continually stalked by Chandra on the phone. This causes much stress to herself and her family. He crashes Kiran's family's Holi celebrations incognito as a member of the band. Surya asks Kiran to offer the band some money for their performance, where Chandra, veiled in Holi colours, whispers "I love you, K-K-K-Kiran" to Kiran, which disturbs her greatly and a foot chase ensues to find the hooligan who's invaded their house, but Chandra soon disappears into the crowd.

When Chandra receives the news of Kiran and Surya's engagement, he tries to shoot and kill Surya when the couple is out shopping for a wedding ring. He misses his aim and Surya begins to chase him, from which Chandra narrowly escapes being recognized by Surya.

Kiran and Surya get married, but Chandra still refuses to give up on Kiran. He defaces the newly married couple's home with graffiti declaring his love, causing more distress to them. To get away from the stalker, Surya takes Kiran on a surprise honeymoon to Switzerland. Learning their location through devious means, Chandra turns up at their hotel in the Alps. Kiran recognizes him from college and the couple welcomes him to be part of their festivities. That very evening, Surya finds out from Kiran's brother that Chandra is the one who has been Kiran's stalker all along. He sends Kiran away on a boat and confronts Chandra. Chandra tries to run, but Surya catches up with him in a forest where they have a fight. Chandra stabs Surya with a knife after feigning surrender, and leaves him for dead. He then goes to the boat and tries to forcefully abduct Kiran, he wants to marry Kiran without her consent. But Surya comes back and brutally beats Chandra. While surya beating Chandra Kiran tells Surya to kill Chandra which will give her peaceful life. Those words will make Chandra realise that only his death will give Kiran a peaceful and happy life. He then proceeds to shoot himself with a gun and dies by saying "I LOVE YOU K-K-K-K-KIRAN". Kiran and Surya then return to India and reunite with their family.

Cast
 Shiva Rajkumar as Commander Surya, Kiran's fiancee (later husband)
 Upendra as Chandru, Kiran's obsessed lover
 Sonali Bendre as Kiran, Surya's fiancee (later wife)
 Anant Nag as Vijay, Kiran's brother 
 Vanitha Vasu as Poonam, Vijay's wife and Kiran's sister-in-law
 Srinath as Admiral - Chandru's father
 Tharakesh Patel 
 K. V. Manjayya 
 Bank Suresh

Production
It marks Sonali Bendre's debut Kannada film and also reunited Shivrajkumar and Upendra after Om.

The songs are composed by Hamsalekha.
The song "preethse preethse" became famous.

Soundtrack
 "Holi Holi" - S. P. Balasubrahmanyam, Rajesh Krishnan, Chitra, Anuradha Paudwal
 "Preethse Preethse" - Hemanth Kumar
 "Sye Sye Preethsye" - Hariharan, Anuradha Paudwal
 "Surya Obba" - Anuradha Sriram, Suresh Peters
 "Yaar Ittaree Chukki" - Hariharan, Anuradha Paudwal
 "Yaaru Illa" - Suresh Peters

References

External links 
 

2000 films
Kannada remakes of Hindi films
2000s Kannada-language films
Films scored by Hamsalekha
Indian romantic thriller films
Indian psychological thriller films
Films directed by D. Rajendra Babu
2000s romantic thriller films
2000 psychological thriller films